Sitha Sin (born 10 March 1950) is a Cambodian athlete. He competed in the men's high jump at the 1972 Summer Olympics.

References

External links
 

1950 births
Living people
Athletes (track and field) at the 1972 Summer Olympics
Cambodian male high jumpers
Olympic athletes of Cambodia
Place of birth missing (living people)